Esad Hasanović (born 24 January 1985) is a Serbian cyclist.

Major results

2007
 1st  National Time Trial Championships
 1st  Under-23 National Road Race Championships
2008
 1st  National Time Trial Championships
 1st Grand Prix Kooperativa
2009
 2nd Trofeo Zsšdi
 2nd National Road Race Championships
 2nd National Time Trial Championships
 6th Tour of Vojvodina I
 10th Overall Giro della Regione Friuli Venezia Giulia
2010
 1st  National Time Trial Championships
 1st Grand Prix of Moscow
 3rd Overall Tour de Serbie
1st Stage 1
2011
 1st  National Criterium Championships
 2nd National Road Race Championships
 2nd National Time Trial Championships
 7th Overall Tour of Alanya
 9th Overall Tour of Gallipoli
2012
 3rd National Time Trial Championships
 6th National Road Race Championships
 9th Tour of Vojvodina II
2013
 1st  National Time Trial Championships
 2nd Overall Tour of Albania
 9th National Road Race Championships

References

1985 births
Living people
Serbian male cyclists